The 1990 Caribbean Cup (known as the Shell Caribbean Cup for sponsorship reasons) was the second edition of the Caribbean Cup, the football championship of the Caribbean, one of the CONCACAF zones. The final stage was hosted by Trinidad and Tobago.

The tournament was not completed. Play was suspended when Jamaat al Muslimeen attempted a coup d'état of the government of Trinidad and Tobago. The tournament was abandoned altogether after Tropical storm Arthur forced the cancellation of the final round of games. Trinidad and Tobago were to meet Martinique in the final, and Jamaica and Barbados were to meet in the third place match.

Qualifying tournament

Zone A

Zone B

Zone C

Zone D

Qualifying

Zone A

Zone B

Qualifying Final

Final group

Final tournament

Group stage

Group A

Group B

Third place match

Final

External links
Tournament details on RSSSF website

Caribbean Cup
Caribbean Cup
International association football competitions hosted by Trinidad and Tobago
1990 in Trinidad and Tobago football